The black wood turtle (Rhinoclemmys funerea),  or black river turtle is one of nine species of turtle in the genus Rhinoclemmys, which is in the family Geoemydidae.
It is found in Costa Rica, Honduras, Nicaragua, and Panama.

References

External links
 Tortoise & Freshwater Turtle Specialist Group 1996.  Rhinoclemmys funerea.   2006 IUCN Red List of Threatened Species.   Downloaded on 29 July 2007.

Rhinoclemmys
Reptiles described in 1875
Taxonomy articles created by Polbot